John C. Wetherby (July 2, 1880 – November 29, 1899) was a private in the United States Army and a posthumous Medal of Honor recipient for his actions in the Philippine–American War.

Wetherby joined the army from Indianapolis in October 1898.

Medal of Honor citation
Rank and organization: Private, Company L, 4th U.S. Infantry. Place and date: Near Imus, Luzon, Philippine Islands, November 20, 1899. Entered service at: Martinsville, Ind. Birth: Morgan County, Ind. Date of issue: April 25, 1902.

Citation:

While carrying important orders on the battlefield, was desperately wounded and, being unable to walk, crawled far enough to deliver his orders.

See also

List of Philippine–American War Medal of Honor recipients

References

External links

1880 births
1899 deaths
United States Army Medal of Honor recipients
United States Army soldiers
American military personnel killed in the Philippine–American War
Military personnel from Indiana
People from Morgan County, Indiana
Philippine–American War recipients of the Medal of Honor